Sheila R. Canby (born 10 January 1949) is Curator Emerita of the Department of Islamic Art at the Metropolitan Museum of Art, New York and a former curator of Islamic art and antiquities at the British Museum. She is a fellow of the Royal Asiatic Society.

Early life
Sheila Canby was born on 10 January 1949. She earned her BA from Vassar College, summa cum laude, and her MA and PhD from Harvard University.

Career
Canby was the Metropolitan Museum of Art's curator of Islamic art from October 2009 to April 2019 and is a former curator of Islamic art and antiquities at the British Museum. She is a fellow of the Royal Asiatic Society. She has held positions at the Brooklyn Museum, Los Angeles County Museum of Art, Philadelphia Museum of Art, Fogg Art Museum, and the Museum of Fine Arts, Boston. She was a visiting lecturer at the School of Oriental and African Studies, London.

Selected publications
 Persian Painting. British Museum Press, London, 1993. 
 Rebellious Reformer: Drawings and Paintings of Riza-Yi 'Abbasi of Isfahan. Azimuth Editions, 1996. 
 Princes, Poets and Paladins: Islamic and Indian Paintings from the Collection of Prince and Princess Sadruddin Aga Khan. British Museum Press, London, 1998. 
 The Golden Age Of Persian Art 1501-1722. British Museum Press, London, 1999. 
 Safavid Art and Architecture. British Museum Press, London, 2002. (Editor) 
 Hunt for Paradise: Court Arts of Safavid Iran 1501-76. Skira Editore, 2003. (Edited with Jon Thompson) 
 Islamic Art In Detail. British Museum Press, London, 2005. 
 Persian Love Poetry. British Museum Press, London, 2005. (With Vesta Sarkhosh Curtis) 
 Shah 'Abbas: The Remaking of Iran. British Museum Press, London, 2009. 
 Shah 'Abbas and The Treasures Of Imperial Iran. British Museum Press, London, 2009. 
 The Shahnama of Shah Tahmasp: The Persian Book of Kings. Yale University Press, New Haven, 2014. 
 Islamic Art: Close-Up. British Museum Press, London, 2015.

References 

1949 births
Living people
Employees of the British Museum
British art historians
Historians of Islamic art
British curators
Fellows of the Royal Asiatic Society
Vassar College alumni
Harvard University alumni
People associated with the Metropolitan Museum of Art
Farabi International Award recipients
American art historians
Women art historians
British women curators